Richmond Centre was a provincial electoral district for the Legislative Assembly of British Columbia, Canada. It was replaced by the Richmond North Centre district after the British Columbia electoral redistribution, 2015.

History

MLAs

Election results 

|-

|- bgcolor="white"
!align="right" colspan=3|Total Valid Votes
!align="right"|17,044
!align="right"|100%
!align="right"|
|- bgcolor="white"
!align="right" colspan=3|Total Rejected Ballots
!align="right"|166
!align="right"|0.96%
!align="right"|
|- bgcolor="white"
!align="right" colspan=3|Turnout
!align="right"|17,210
!align="right"|40.97%
!align="right"|
|}

*FPTP = First Past The Post, BC-STV = Single Transferable Vote
|-

|-
 
|NDP
|Dale Jackaman
|align="right"|6,051
|align="right"|32.49%
|align="right"|
|align="right"|$11,266

|- bgcolor="white"
!align="right" colspan=3|Total Valid Votes
!align="right"|18,626
!align="right"|100%
!align="right"|
|- bgcolor="white"
!align="right" colspan=3|Total Rejected Ballots
!align="right"|193
!align="right"|1.04%
!align="right"|
|- bgcolor="white"
!align="right" colspan=3|Turnout
!align="right"|18,819
!align="right"|49.42%
!align="right"|
|}

|-

|-
 
|NDP
|Jaana Grant
|align="right"|2,206
|align="right"|13.14%
|align="right"|
|align="right"|$3,250

|Conservative
|Frank Peter Tofin
|align="right"|165
|align="right"|0.98%
|align="right"|
|align="right"|$100
|- bgcolor="white"
!align="right" colspan=3|Total Valid Votes
!align="right"|16,785
!align="right"|100.00%
!align="right"|
|- bgcolor="white"
!align="right" colspan=3|Total Rejected Ballots
!align="right"|140
!align="right"|0.83%
!align="right"|
|- bgcolor="white"
!align="right" colspan=3|Turnout
!align="right"|16,925
!align="right"|69.10%
!align="right"|
|}

|-

|-
 
|NDP
|Doug Black
|align="right"|5,723
|align="right"|32.01%
|align="right"|
|align="right"|$26,329

|Independent
|Joseph Gaudet
|align="right"|65
|align="right"|0.36%
|align="right"|
|align="right"|

|Natural Law
|Mark McCooey
|align="right"|38
|align="right"|0.21%
|align="right"|
|align="right"|$100
|- bgcolor="white"
!align="right" colspan=3|Total Valid Votes
!align="right"|17,876
!align="right"|100.00%
!align="right"|
|- bgcolor="white"
!align="right" colspan=3|Total Rejected Ballots
!align="right"|144
!align="right"|0.80%
!align="right"|
|- bgcolor="white"
!align="right" colspan=3|Turnout
!align="right"|18,020
!align="right"|68.67%
!align="right"|
|}

|-

 
|NDP
|Brian Collins
|align="right"|6,522
|align="right"|35.46%
|align="right"|
|align="right"|$34,977
|-

|- bgcolor="white"
!align="right" colspan=3|Total Valid Votes
!align="right"|18,393
|- bgcolor="white"
!align="right" colspan=3|Total Rejected Ballots
!align="right"|390
!align="right"|2.08%
|- bgcolor="white"
!align="right" colspan=3|Turnout
!align="right"|18,783
!align="right"|74.42%
|}

Student Vote Results 
A student vote is a mock election held alongside BC general elections in schools, the purpose, is to educate persons under legal age about government and elections.

2013 British Columbia Student Vote

2009 British Columbia Student Vote

2009 British Columbia Electoral Reform Referendum (Student) 

*FPTP = First Past the Post, BC-STV = Single Transferable Vote

2005 British Columbia Student Vote

2005 British Columbia Electoral Reform Referendum (Student)

References

External links 
Results of 2001 election (pdf)
2001 Expenditures (pdf)
Results of 1996 election
1996 Expenditures
Results of 1991 election
1991 Expenditures
Website of the Legislative Assembly of British Columbia
BC Stats Profile

British Columbia provincial electoral districts
Politics of Richmond, British Columbia
Provincial electoral districts in Greater Vancouver and the Fraser Valley